The first season of  Alarm für Cobra 11 – Die Autobahnpolizei aired between March 12, and May 7, 1996.

Format
The main cast at the beginning of the series were Johannes Brandrup as Frank Stolte, Rainer Strecker as Ingo Fischer and Almut Eggert as Katharina Lamprecht. Strecker left the cast after the episode "Red Rose, Black Death", where his character was killed off, and was replaced by Erdoğan Atalay as Semir Gerkhan in the episode "The New Partner". Johannes Brandrup departed from the series after the season finale.

Cast
 Johannes Brandrup - Frank Stolte
 Rainer Strecker - Ingo Fischer (episodes 1−2)
 Erdoğan Atalay - Semir Gerkhan (episodes 3−9)
 Almut Eggert - Katharina Lamprecht

Episodes

1996 German television seasons
1996 German television series debuts